Sisters of the Red Death is an album by Vendetta Red, released in 2005. It was the band's second album for Epic Records.

Production
Sisters of the Red Death is a concept album about nuclear war. It was produced by Howard Benson.

The track listing is slightly different depending on the format of the album.

Critical reception
Alternative Press called the album "packed with a dozen fist-pumping anthems, each sounding as massive as any arena-rock staple from 15 years prior."

Track listing
 "Vendetta Red Cried Rape On Their Date With Destiny" - 3:37
 "The Body and the Blood" - 3:47
 "A Dark Heart Silhouette" - 3:58
 "Shiver" - 4:03
 "In Lieu of Dead Brides" - 3:53
 "Silhouette Serenade" - 3:21
 "The Banshee Ballet" - 2:42
 "The Great Castration" - 4:34
 "Gloria" - 3:50
 "Run" - 4:11
 "Coital Improv" - 3:25
 "A Joyless Euphoria" - 6:08
 "Depressionesque" - Hidden song

The unlisted song "Shoot Up With God" appears at the end of the CD version of the album.

References

Vendetta Red albums
2005 albums
Epic Records albums
Albums produced by Howard Benson